Ayrshire Football League is a defunct soccer league in Scotland.

Formed in 1891 by Annbank, Ayr Parkhouse, Beith, Galston, Irvine, Kilwinning Monkcastle, Mauchline, Newmilns, Saltcoats Victoria and Stevenston Thistle F.C.

By 1893 the Ayrshire Football League had increased to 16 clubs. For some, this was too many and the likelihood of playing to small crowds was irksome. So 7 clubs broke away to form the Ayrshire Football Combination.

The Ayrshire Football League continued with a less powerful membership but finally disbanded in 1895.

Champions
1891–92 Annbank F.C.
1892–93 Annbank F.C.
1893–94 Saltcoats Victoria F.C.
1894–95 Dalry F.C.

Membership (1891–1895)
Annbank F.C. 1891–1893
Ayr Parkhouse 1891–1893
Beith F.C. 1891–1895
Dalry F.C. 1893–1895
Galston 1891–1895
Hurlford F.C. 1892–1893
Irvine F.C. (1877) 1891–95
Kilbirnie F.C. 1892–1893, 1894–1895
Kilmarnock Athletic F.C. 1892–1894
Kilwinning Eglinton F.C. 1893–1895
Kilwinning Monkcastle F.C. 1891–1894
Mauchline F.C. 1891–1892
Newmilns F.C. 1891–1894
Saltcoats Victoria F.C. 1891–1894
Stevenston Thistle F.C. 1891–1893

Membership (1900–1901)
The league was briefly revived in 1900–01 by Ayr Parkhouse, Beith, Galston, Kilwinning Eglinton, Maybole, and Stevenston Thistle F.C.

References

See also
 Scottish Football (Defunct Leagues)

Defunct football leagues in Scotland